Luiz Artigas Martins (29 July 1914 – 3 May 1998) was a Brazilian sports shooter. He competed in the 50 metre rifle, three positions and 50 metre rifle, prone events at the 1960 Summer Olympics.

References

External links
 

1914 births
1998 deaths
Brazilian male sport shooters
Olympic shooters of Brazil
Shooters at the 1960 Summer Olympics
Sportspeople from São Paulo